Events from the year 1534 in Ireland.

Incumbent
Lord: Henry VIII

Events
February – Gerald FitzGerald, 9th Earl of Kildare, is summoned to London, and appoints Thomas FitzGerald, 10th Earl of Kildare deputy governor of Ireland in his absence.
June – Thomas FitzGerald, 10th Earl of Kildare (Silken Thomas) revolts. He had heard rumours that his father had been executed in the Tower of London and, as a result, publicly renounces his allegiance to King Henry VIII.
July
 Thomas FitzGerald attacks Dublin Castle, but his army is routed.
 An earthquake with its epicentre in North Wales is felt in Dublin.
July 28 – Archbishop John Alen, Chancellor of Ireland (who has attempted to mediate in the revolt) is murdered at Clontarf by retainers of Thomas FitzGerald.
September 2 – Gerald FitzGerald, 9th Earl of Kildare, Thomas' father, dies in the Tower of London.

Births

Deaths
September 2 – Gerald FitzGerald, 9th Earl of Kildare (b. 1487)
Thomas FitzGerald, 11th Earl of Desmond
John Alen, English-born canon lawyer, Archbishop of Dublin (b. 1476).

References

 
1530s in Ireland
Ireland
Years of the 16th century in Ireland